The Mălaia (also: Mălăița) is a right tributary of the river Lotru in Romania. It flows into the Lotru near the village Malaia.

References

Rivers of Romania
Rivers of Vâlcea County